Three ships of the Royal Australian Navy (RAN) have been named HMAS Swan, for the Swan River in Western Australia.

, a River-class destroyer launched in 1915, decommissioned in 1928, and broken up for scrap
, a Grimsby-class sloop launched in 1936, decommissioned in 1962, and broken up for scrap
, a River-class destroyer escort launched in 1967, decommissioned in 1996, and scuttled as a dive wreck in 1997

Battle honours
Ships named HMAS Swan are entitled to carry four battle honours:
Adriatic 1917–18
Darwin 1942
Pacific 1941–45
New Guinea 1943–44

See also
 , twenty ships of the Royal Navy.
 , three ships of the United States Navy.

References

Royal Australian Navy ship names